The Southern Premier Cricket League is the top level of competition for recreational club cricket in central southern England. The League was founded in 1969 under the name Southern Cricket League, and in 2000 it adopted the name Southern Premier Cricket League when it became an ECB Premier League.

The league primarily covers Hampshire, but also has clubs from Dorset, Isle of Wight, Surrey, West Sussex, and Wiltshire. In the past there have also been clubs from Berkshire.

The league runs a Premier Division, Division One, Division Two and a Division Three. Relegated teams from Division Three are relegated into the Hampshire Cricket League.

2022 member clubs

ECB Premier Division
 Bashley (Rydal)
 Bournemouth 
 Burridge 
 Hampshire Academy
 Havant
 Hook and Newnham Basics
 Lymington
 St Cross Symondians 
 South Wilts
 Totton and Eling

Division One
 Alton 
 Basingstoke and North Hants
 Calmore Sports
 Liphook and Ripsley
 New Milton
 Portsmouth
 Rowledge
 Sarisbury Athletic Cricket Club
 Sparsholt
 Ventnor

Division Two
 Andover
 Bashley Rydal II
 Fair Oak
 Fawley
 Hambledon
 Hartley Wintney
 Hook and Newnham Basics II
 Old Tauntonians and Romsey
 St Cross Symondians II
 Waterlooville

Division Three
 Basingstoke and North Hants II
 Gosport Borough
 Havant II
 Langley Manor
 South Wilts II
 Paultons
 Portsmouth and Southsea
 Purbrook
 Trojans
 Sway

Champions

ECB Premier Division

Division One

Division Two

Division Three

Championships won 
 

Source:

ECB Premier Division Performance by season from 2000

References

External links
 Southern Premier Cricket League website
 Southern Premier Cricket League at play-cricket.com

English domestic cricket competitions
Cricket in Dorset
Cricket in Hampshire
Cricket in Wiltshire
ECB Premier Leagues
Sports leagues established in 1969
Sports leagues established in 2000